Walls, known locally as Waas (Old Norse: Vagar = "Sheltered Bays" (voes) - the Ordnance Survey added the "ll" as they thought it was a corruption of "walls". Cf Vágar and Vágur in the Faroe Islands), is a settlement on the south side of West Mainland, Shetland Islands in Scotland. The settlement is at the head of Vaila Sound and sheltered even from southerly storms by the islands of Linga and Vaila. Walls is within the parish of Walls and Sandness.

History
One of its old names is "Vagaland", hence the name of the local poet.

A pier was built at Walls in the 18th century, and from 1838, it was a center for fish curing. Walls itself is a quieter place than once it was. The large houses of Bayhall, now converted into flats, and Voe House are signs of past wealth, as are the three churches visible around the head of the sound. Two are still in use, while the third bears a sign showing its later conversion to a bakery.

Waas was the childhood home of two fine poets, Vagaland and Christine de Luca, and in 1884 was the birthplace of both Peter Fraser (1884-1966), musician and founder member of the Shetland Fiddlers' Society, and William Moffatt, the author.

Community
A little to the east of the centre of the village is the marina, making this a popular base for leisure sailors. The fishing vessels that are still based in Walls tend to use the pier a few hundred yards along the west side of Vaila Sound.

Today it is home to the dialect children's writer Iris Sandison, also secretary to the local history group.

Waas has long been famed for its annual Agricultural Show. A short film of 'da Waas Show' in the early 1960s, by the late Dr. Albert Hunter, is available at the link below.

References

External links

map
Listen to recordings of a speaker of Walls Scots
Waas Show - early 60s film by Dr. Albert Hunter

 

Villages in Mainland, Shetland